Waisai is a town in the south of the island of Waigeo in the Raja Ampat Islands, Indonesia. Founded in 2003, it is the capital of the Raja Ampat Regency and is home to a little over 8,000 people. It is a transit point for tourists visiting the rest of the archipelago, and its airport is reachable by plane from the larger cities of Manado and Sorong, or ferry from the latter. While it is mainly a stopping point for tourists before continuing to the rest of the islands, the town includes a dive resort, several accommodations, and two beaches.

Climate
Waisai has a tropical rainforest climate (Af) with heavy rainfall year-round. Unlike most parts of Indonesia, it experiences a rainfall maximum during the low-sun season due to local wind currents.

References

Populated places in Raja Ampat
Regency seats of Southwest Papua